Emergency: Fighters for Life, also known as simply Emergency, is a tactical role-playing video game developed for Microsoft Windows in 1998. Four sequels have been released: Emergency 2, Emergency 3, Emergency 4, and also Emergency 5.

Gameplay
The player receives a series of missions that he must complete involving the rescue of injured and endangered civilians, extinguishing fires, and arresting any violators of the law, some scenarios would be like: an accident at a race track, a plane crash, a flood, a traffic accident and a bomb threat, as well as scenarios based on true events such as Ramstein airshow disaster.

Reception

The game received mixed reviews according to the review aggregation website GameRankings. Next Generation said, "As a whole, Emergency shows promise but has too many individual flaws to be a worthwhile purchase. The developers should be commended for an original idea, but the execution is poor. We hope they've learned from their mistakes and their next effort will be a bit more polished."

References

External links
 

1998 video games
ASCII Corporation games
Medical video games
Single-player video games
Sixteen Tons Entertainment games
Tactical role-playing video games
Video games about firefighting
Video games about police officers
Video games developed in Germany
Windows games
Windows-only games
WizardWorks games